Richard Longfield, 1st Viscount Longueville (1734–1811) was an Irish Member of Parliament and later a peer.

He was High Sheriff of County Cork in 1758–61. He sat in the Irish House of Commons for Charleville in County Cork (1761–68), and for Cork City (1776–83). In 1783 he was declared not duly elected. He sat for Baltimore, County Cork (1783–1790) before regaining the Cork City seat (1790–96).

Longfield was granted two titles in the Peerage of Ireland. On 1 October 1795, was created Baron Longueville, of Longueville in the County of Cork and on 29 December 1800, he was created Viscount Longueville some months after the extinction of that title in the Peerage of England. Both his titles became extinct on his death in 1811.

References

1734 births
1811 deaths
Longfield
Longfield
Longfield
Longfield
Peers of Ireland created by George III
Viscounts in the Peerage of Ireland
Members of the Irish House of Lords
Members of the Parliament of Ireland (pre-1801) for County Cork constituencies
Members of the Parliament of Ireland (pre-1801) for Cork City